The Battle of Mardia, also known as Battle of Campus Mardiensis or Battle of Campus Ardiensis, was probably fought at modern Harmanli (Bulgaria) in Thrace, in late 316/early 317 between the forces of Roman Emperors Constantine I and Licinius.

Background 
Open civil war between Constantine and Licinius broke out in 316 when the former invaded Licinius' Balkan provinces. After his crushing defeat at the Battle of Cibalae on October 8, 316, (some historians date it in 314), Licinius fled to Sirmium then further south to Adrianople. There he collected a second army, under the command of an officer named Valerius Valens whom he raised to the rank of Augustus. Simultaneously, he tried to negotiate with Constantine but the latter, insulted by the elevation of Valens and confident from his recent victory, rejected the peace offer.

The battle 
In the meantime, Constantine had moved through the Balkan mountains and established his base at Philippi or Philippopolis. He then led the bulk of his army against Licinius. In the ensuing fierce battle, both sides inflicted heavy injuries on each other until darkness interrupted the indecisive struggle. Reportedly, Constantine decided the issue by sending a force to attack Licinius in the rear, forcing him to retreat. However, his well-disciplined troops kept ranks, withdrawing in good order, and both sides suffered heavy losses as Constantine brought his forces to bear, hoping to crush the enemy. During the night, Licinius managed to keep his army from disintegration and retreated north-west towards Beroe/Augusta Traiana. Thus, Constantine was again victorious but not decisively

Another possible location for the battle place is a few km west-southwest of Adrianople (modern Edirne), at the basin of the Ardas River (ancient Harpessos), a tributary of the Maritsa River.

Aftermath 

Constantine, thinking that Licinius was fleeing to Byzantium in order to retreat to his Asian base, headed to that direction, unintentionally placing Licinius between himself and his communication lines with the West. It seemed that his aggressiveness had turned against him this time. However, both belligerents had reasons to come to terms since Licinius was still in precarious position, so he sent a certain Mestrianus to negotiate with Constantine. Even then, Constantine delayed the discussions until he was made sure that the outcome of the war was indeed uncertain. A critical point might be when he received news of a sudden enemy raid that captured his baggage and the royal entourage. 

According to the peace finalized at Serdica on 1 March 317 (a date chosen deliberately by Constantine because it was the anniversary of his father's elevation), Licinius recognised Constantine as his superior in government, ceded to him all European territories except for Thrace and deposed and executed Valens. Constantine named himself and Licinius consuls while his two sons Crispus and Constantine II and Licinius' son, also called Licinius, were all appointed Caesars. The peace lasted for about seven years.

Citations

References
 Anonymus Valesianus. Origo Constantini Imperatoris at The Latin Library
 Eusebius. Life of Constantine, transl. and commentary by Averil Cameron, Stuart George Hall, Oxford University Press, 1999. .
 Lieu, Samuel N. C., Montserrat, Dominic. From Constantine to Julian: A Source History, Routledge, 1996. 
 Lenski, N. E. The Cambridge Companion to the Age of Constantine, Cambridge University Press, 2006. 
 Odahl, Charles M. Constantine and the Christian Empire, Routledge, 2004. 
 Potter, David S. The Roman Empire at Bay AD 180–395, Routledge, 2004. 
 Treadgold, Warren. A history of the Byzantine State and Society, Stanford University Press 1997. 
 Zosimus, Historia Nova (Greek: Νέα Ιστορία), book 1, in Corpus Scriptorum Historiae Byzantinae, ed. Bekker, Weber, Bonn, 1837

Mardia
Mardia
Mardia
316
310s in the Roman Empire